Jurm District is one of the 28 districts of Badakhshan province in northeast Afghanistan. The district capital is a town named Jurm. The district is 3 hours from the center of the province in Fayzabad, and is home to approximately 41,910 residents. The highest point of the Afghan Hindu Kush is located in Jurm District, at 6729 meters. The district consist of clusters and villages. Ferghamenj, Kyb, Kyteb, Ularyb, Ferghameru, Khustak, and Iskan are the clusters. Each cluster contain villages; the district is largely Tajik speaking.

References

External links
Map at the Afghanistan Information Management Services

Districts of Badakhshan Province